Old Hill is a location in the metropolitan borough of Sandwell in the West Midlands, England.

Old Hill is also the name of the following:

Places in the United States
 Old Hill, Connecticut, a census-designated place
 Old Hill, Indiana, an unincorporated community
 Old Hill, Springfield, Massachusetts, a neighborhood of Springfield

Other uses
 Old Hill Cricket Club, a cricket club in Cradley Heath, West Midlands, England
 Old Hill Wanderers F.C., a 19th-century association football club based in Old Hill, West Midlands
 Old Hill railway station, Old Hill, West Midlands